Proutiella latifascia is a moth of the family Notodontidae. It is found on the western slope of the Colombian and Ecuadorean Andes.

External links
Species page at Tree of Life project

Notodontidae of South America
Moths described in 1920